Molavi Metro Station is a station in Tehran Metro Line 7. It is located at the intersection of Molavi Street and Mostafa Khomeini, also known as Molavi Intersection. The station is at the southeastern edge of Tehran Bazaar, and near Shahid Akbarabadi Hospital.

References

Tehran Metro stations
Railway stations opened in 2017